SCO or sco may refer to:

Businesses and organizations
 Santa Cruz Operation, a company founded in 1979 that existed under that name until 2001
 SCO Group, a software company formerly called Caldera International and Caldera Systems
 SCO OpenServer (formerly SCO Unix), an operating system made by the above companies
 Shanghai Cooperation Organisation, a Eurasian inter-governmental political, economic, and security alliance
 Society of Canadian Ornithologists
 Southern College of Optometry in Memphis, Tennessee
 Special Communications Organization, a Pakistani telecommunication company
 The ICAO airline code for Scoot

Orchestras
 Scottish Chamber Orchestra
 Singapore Chinese Orchestra

Science and technology
 Scorpius, abbreviation for the constellation
 Self-checkout machines, automated alternatives to traditional cashier-staffed checkout at retailers
 Single cell oil, a type of oil produced by a microbe
 Synchronous Connection Oriented protocol, used for audio devices in the Bluetooth protocol stack
 Synthetic crude oil, a type of crude oil

Other uses
 .sco, a formerly proposed top-level domain for Scotland
 Aktau Airport in Kazakhstan (IATA code SCO)
 Angers SCO, a French football club
 Scots language (ISO 639 alpha-3 code: sco)
 Selected Characteristics of Occupations, a companion volume to the U.S. Department of Labor's Dictionary of Occupational Titles
 Single Cell Orchestra, stage name of musician Miguel Fierro
 Sports teams representing Scotland, by country code
 Syllabus, or Standard Course Outline
 United States Office of Special Counsel (disambiguation), various government offices referred to as the "Special Counsel's Office"